The Davis Museum in Wellesley, Massachusetts is located on the Wellesley College campus. The college art collection was first displayed in the Farnsworth Art Building, founded in 1889. The museum in its present form opened in 1993 in a building designed by Rafael Moneo.

The permanent collection of about 11,000 objects ranges from antiquity to the present day.
The artists represented in the collection include Jacopo Sansovino, Pinturicchio, Hiroshige, Giorgio Vasari, Lavinia Fontana, Angelica Kauffmann, Ammi Phillips, John Singleton Copley, George Inness, Paul Cézanne, Georg Kolbe, Oskar Kokoschka, Willem de Kooning, Jackson Pollock, Lee Krasner, Andy Warhol, Alex Katz, Al Held, Knox Martin, Robert Rauschenberg, Sol LeWitt as well as works by Giacomo Manzù and Alberto Diego Giacometti. A large, recently restored mosaic from Antioch, excavated in a joint expedition with the Worcester Art Museum, is also present.

Notes

External links 

Wellesley, Massachusetts
Museums in Norfolk County, Massachusetts
Art museums and galleries in Massachusetts
University museums in Massachusetts
Museums of ancient Greece in the United States
Museums of ancient Rome in the United States
Museums of American art
Wellesley College